State Route 264 (SR 264) is a  state highway in Esmeralda County, Nevada, United States.  It connects California State Route 266 to U.S. Route 6 (US 6) via the town of Dyer, Nevada.  The majority of the route is known as Fish Lake Valley Road, with the northern portion referred to as the Dicalite Cutoff.  A majority of the route was originally designated State Route 3A.

Route description
From there, the highway follows Fish Lake Valley Road north to pass through the small community of Dyer. As the route heads north from Dyer through Fish Lake Valley, Boundary Peak, the highest point in the state of Nevada, comes into view on the west side of the highway. At this point, SR 264 curves northwest to follow the Dicalite Cutoff.

History
The southern  of State Route 264 and all of State Route 773 were both previously designated State Route 3A.

SR 3A first appears on state highway maps in 1933 as an unimproved road stretching from the California–Nevada state line to the junction of State Route 3 (now US 95) and State Route 15 (now US 6) at Coaldale. By 1941, SR 3A had been relocated to a new gravel road alignment which resembles that of present-day SR 264 and SR 773. The road was paved between US 6 and Dyer by 1949, and the remainder of the route received pavement by 1953.

The Dicalite Cutoff first appears on the state map in 1978. This was also the first edition to show State Route 3A being replaced by State Route 264 as part of the statewide renumbering of Nevada's highway system.  The designations for current SR 264 and SR 773 were approved by the Nevada Department of Highways on July 1, 1976—the routing of these highways north of Fish Lake Valley was not made clear on state maps until 1991, when SR 773 was finally shown on the map.

Major intersections

See also

References

264
Transportation in Esmeralda County, Nevada